Domenico Maria Belzoppi was Captain Regent of San Marino in 1849 (April–October). He served with Pier Matteo Berti. During his term, Giuseppe Garibaldi came to San Marino after fleeing from Rome. He found safety here. Garubaldi actually met with Belzoppi. Because San Marino offered Garibaldi safety in 1849, it was able to remain independent during Italian unification.

Captains Regent of San Marino
Members of the Grand and General Council
Year of death missing
Year of birth missing